Park Avenue and State Street Historic District is a national historic district located at Brockport in Monroe County, New York. The district encompasses 90 contributing buildings and 1 contributing site in a predominantly residential section of Brockport.   The district developed between about 1830 and 1930, and includes buildings in a variety of architectural styles including Greek Revival, Gothic Revival, Italianate, Queen Anne, and Colonial Revival.  Located in the district is the separately listed First Presbyterian Church.  Other notable buildings include houses dated to the 1830s and 1840s.

It was listed on the National Register of Historic Places in 2015.

References

Brockport, New York
Historic districts on the National Register of Historic Places in New York (state)
Greek Revival architecture in New York (state)
Gothic Revival architecture in New York (state)
Italianate architecture in New York (state)
Queen Anne architecture in New York (state)
Colonial Revival architecture in New York (state)
Historic districts in Monroe County, New York
National Register of Historic Places in Monroe County, New York